Council of Managers of National Antarctic Programs (COMNAP) is the international association, formed in 1988, which brings together the National Antarctic Programs. National Antarctic Programs are those organizations that have responsibility for delivering and supporting scientific research in the Antarctic Treaty Area on behalf of their respective governments and in the spirit of the Antarctic Treaty. Its secretariat is in Christchurch, New Zealand. COMNAP has an observer status at the Antarctic Treaty System's yearly Antarctic Treaty Consultative Meetings (ATCM).

See also
 Scientific Committee on Antarctic Research
 Michelle Rogan-Finnemore, Executive Secretary

References

External links
 COMNAP Web Site

Antarctica agreements
Antarctic agencies